Events in the year 1920 in China.

Incumbents
President: Xu Shichang
Premier: Jin Yunpeng

Events
 July 14–23 – Zhili–Anhui War
 December 16 – 1920 Haiyuan earthquake
 Second Guangdong–Guangxi War
 Alice Dollar incident
 Establishment of the Republic of China Air Force

Births
April 18 – Wang Zigan, papercutting artist (died 2000)
May 3 – Xu Liangying, physicist (died 2013)
August 20 – Jiang Zhuyun, revolutionary martyr (died 1949)
September 30 – Eileen Chang, writer  (died 1995)
November 24 – Chao Kuang Piu, industrialist and philanthropist (died 2021)

Deaths
 January 17 – Yang Changji, teacher, scholar and writer (born 1871)
 January 23 – Mao Yichang, farmer and grain merchant, father of Mao Zedong (born 1870)
 Li Ruiqing
 Li Chun

References

 
1920s in China
Years of the 20th century in China